DZUP (1602 AM) is a campus radio station owned and operated by the University of the Philippines Diliman. Its studio facility is located at the 2nd floor, Media Center of the College of Mass Communication, U.P. Diliman campus, in Quezon City; while its transmitter is located at Village B corner Delos Reyes St., UP Village, Diliman, QC. At present, the station operates Weekdays from 10:00 AM to 3:00 PM, and is able to broadcast all year-round.

The station is being used as a laboratory for the Broadcast Communication students of the university, with programming that includes music programs and request shows to informative segments and talk shows. It serves as the community radio station of the U.P. Diliman campus, which has also become the bastion of freedom of expression and academic freedom within the university.

Awards and recognitions
Over the recent years, DZUP has been nominated for Best AM Station for four (4) non-consecutive years at the KBP Golden Dove Awards. Aside from the station, most of its programs, special promotional materials and public service announcements were recognized by the KBP, the Catholic Mass Media Awards (CMMA), and other award-giving organizations.

Stations owned by other UP campuses

See also
 Radyo Katipunan
 DLSU Green Giant FM
 UST Tiger Radio
 University of the Philippines Diliman

References

External links 
 
  on DILC

University of the Philippines Diliman
Radio stations in Metro Manila
College radio stations in the Philippines
Radio stations established in 1958
1958 establishments in the Philippines